Arena Yerofey is a bandy arena in Khabarovsk, Russia, hosting the 2015 Bandy World Championship. The 2018 Bandy World Championship was also hosted there, but only Division A that time around. The arena was built in 2013, is 46,000 m2 and can seat 10,000 spectators. It is named after Yerofey Khabarov, the city's eponym.

The arena is the home ice for bandy club SKA-Neftyanik, which plays in the Super League and was its current champion in 2019.

References

External links
Official site
A model of the stadium

Bandy venues in Russia
Sport in Khabarovsk
Bandy World Championships stadiums